This was the first edition of the tournament.

Andrea Gámiz and Georgina García Pérez won the title, defeating Anna Danilina and Conny Perrin in the final, 6–4, 3–6, [10–3].

Seeds

Draw

Draw

References
Main Draw

Centenario Open - Doubles